Elcano is a locality and council located in the municipality of Valle de Egüés, in Navarre province, Spain. As of 2020, it has a population of 200.

Geography 
Elcano is located 11km east-northeast of Pamplona.

References

Populated places in Navarre